Sir Howard Leslie Morrison  (18 August 1935 – 24 September 2009) was a New Zealand entertainer. From 1964 until his death in 2009, he was one of New Zealand's leading television and concert performers.

Early life
Of Māori (Te Arawa), Irish, and Scottish descent, Morrison  was born to Temuera Leslie Morrison, a Māori All Black who worked for the Māori Affairs Department, and Kahurangi Morrison (née Gertrude Harete Davidson) who was known for her work in culture and entertainment.

He grew up in Rotorua and in Ruatahuna near Waikaremoana. He attended a "native school" in the Urewera before going to Te Aute College and Rotorua Boys' High School.

After leaving school he had a variety of manual jobs including survey chainman, electricity meter reader and storeman at the Whakatu freezing works.

Family

Morrison and his three surviving sisters, Judy Tapsell, Rene Mitchell and Linda Morrison, lost their oldest brother Laurie in 1974. Another brother, Charlie, died in infancy and youngest sister Atareta Maxwell died suddenly in January 2007 from a heart attack. Their mother Kahurangi died in 1995, and their father Temuera when they were young.

Career

In 1955, Morrison assembled vocal groups to entertain at Rotorua rugby club socials. In 1956, he was a member of the successful Aotearoa Concert Party that toured Australia. In this group was Gerry Merito who with Morrison formed the Ohinemutu Quartet which was later renamed the Howard Morrison Quartet. Other original members of the quartet were Morrison's brother Laurie and his cousin John, but they left and were replaced by Wi Wharekura and Noel Kingi who were fixtures in the quartet at its heights. In 1966 he appeared in the John O'Shea film Don't Let It Get You. Throughout the 1980s and early 1990s he was the spokesman for Bic products such as lighters and pens, appearing in many television commercials for the brand.

The hymn "How Great Thou Art" became Morrison's de facto theme song for the latter part of his career, after a recording of it by Morrison became one of the country's biggest selling singles.

Honours and achievements

In 1970, he received the Benny Award from the Variety Artists Club of New Zealand Inc.

In the 1976 New Year Honours, Morrison was appointed an officer of the Order of the British Empire, for services to entertainment, and he was made a Knight Bachelor in the 1990 Queen's Birthday Honours, also for services to entertainment.

In March 2006, Morrison was awarded an honorary doctorate by the University of Waikato, joining such alumni as Janet Frame, Dame Malvina Major, Hare Puke, Tui Adams, Dame Kiri Te Kanawa, Neil and Tim Finn, Michael King, Margaret Mahy and Rotorua historian Don Stafford in receiving the award.

On 14 October 2009, Morrison was selected by Te Aute College to be a part of its 1st XV leaders group at a function at Te Papa in Wellington. The honour is given to former pupils over the age of 55 who have made a significant contribution to Māori society. Morrison attended Te Aute College from 1949 to 1952.

Death
Morrison died in his sleep from a heart attack and was found by one of his grandchildren on taking him his morning cup of tea. He died in Ohinemutu and lay in state in Tamatekapua, the premier meeting house of Te Arawa at Te Papaiouru Marae in Rotorua.
He was survived by his wife Rangiwhata Ann Manahi (born 1937, married 1957) known as Lady Kuia, two sons and a daughter Donna Mariana Grant, Richard Te Tau Morrison and Howard Morrison Jr. He was also uncle to movie actor Temuera Morrison and kapa haka performer Taini Morrison.
 	 
Attendees at his tangihanga (funeral) included Rotorua mayor Kevin Winter, Chinese ambassador Zhang Limin, Sir Michael Fay, MPs Tariana Turia, Georgina te Heuheu, Hekia Parata, Steve Chadwick and Rotorua MP Todd McClay, then former MP Winston Peters, Te Puni Kokiri chief executive Leith Comer and Māori king Tuheitia Paki.

Morrison was buried at Kauae Cemetery in Ngongotahā, Rotorua. His grave lies alongside those of his parents and other close whānau.

Discography

 Discogs

The Howard Morrison Quartet

Singles
Released on Zodiac Records
 "Po Kare Kare Ana" (1959)
 "Hawaiian Cowboy Song" (1960)

Released on La Gloria Records
 "Where Have All the Flowers Gone?" (1961)
 "George, the Wilder N.Z. Boy" (1964)

Released on unknown label
 "Whakaaria Mai (How Great Thou Art)" (1981)

Albums and EPs
Released on Zodiac Records
 4 – The Fabulous Howard Morrison Quartet EP (1960)
 "The Battle of the Waikato" (1960)
 
Released on La Gloria Records
 Four Popular Maori Songs Volume One (1960)
 Pot-Pourri (1960)
 On Stage – Off Stage (1960)
 These Were Their Finest (1960)
 Maori Songs (1962)
 Alive! Need We Say More? (1962)
 Hits of the Road (1962)
 Mind If We Sing? (1962)
 Laugh Along EP (1964)
 Take Ten (1967)
 Born Free (1968)
 Power Game (1969)
 Return of a Legend: Joe Brown (1975)
 Morrison Magic (1979)

Solo

Studio albums

Other albums
 Howard Morrison (1982)
 Songs of New Zealand (1985)
 Give Your Love – On Stage Off Stage (1998)
 This Is My Life (2009)

Video
 Once in a Lifetime: He kotuku rerenga tahi (DVD, 2009)

References

External links
Biography at Music.net.nz
Biography on NZHistory.net.nz
A number of full-length documentaries featuring Howard Morrison are available online from NZ On Screen including This Is Your Life – Sir Howard Morrison (1989)
Obituary in The Times

1935 births
2009 deaths
New Zealand people of Irish descent
New Zealand people of Scottish descent
Singers awarded knighthoods
New Zealand Knights Bachelor
New Zealand Officers of the Order of the British Empire
People from Rotorua
People educated at Te Aute College
Te Arawa people
Zodiac Records (New Zealand) artists
New Zealand Māori musicians
New Zealand Māori male singers
20th-century New Zealand male singers